Vanessa Mahi (born 17 December 1997), known professionally as Ivorian Doll, is a British rapper and Internet personality of Ivorian descent. She made her debut in collaboration with Abigail Asante, releasing singles under the name Abigail x Ivorian Doll. She has since gone on to release several singles as a solo artist,

Early life
Mahi was born in Flensburg, Germany to parents from the Ivory Coast and moved to East London when she was three years old with her father. Her mother initially stayed in Germany, later joining the family when Mahi was a teenager and her parents reunited. Her pseudonym refers to her Ivorian heritage. Mahi's father is a pastor. He took her to acting classes from the age of 11. She attended Haggerston School.

Career
Before starting her music career, Mahi was a YouTuber. Mahi describes herself as having gone into a rap career "accidentally".

After making her musical debut collaborating with Abigail Asante, Mahi began releasing music as a solo performer in late 2019. Her debut single was "Queen of Drill".

She released her breakout track, "Rumours", in April 2020. The music video for the track on YouTube reached a million views within a month.

Mahi was nominated for Best Newcomer in the 2020 MOBO Awards.

In December 2020, Birmingham rapper Lady Leshurr released a diss track about Mahi, "DIV". Mahi was announced as part of the Wireless Festival 2021 lineup in April 2021. She also performed at Reading Festival 2021.

In 2021, she collaborated with Birmingham's Duran Duran on the track "Hammerhead" for their album Future Past, released in October 2021.

Artistry 
Mahi has described Nicki Minaj, Lil' Kim and Foxy Brown as musical influences.

Discography

Singles
 'Queen of Drill (QOD)' (2019)
 'Rumours' (2020)
 'Body Bag' (2020)
 'Clout' (2020)
 'Bow Down' (2021)
 'Boss' (2022)
 'Big Booty' (2022)
 'Messy' (2022)

References

External links 
 

1997 births
Living people
Black British women rappers
British Internet celebrities
English people of Ivorian descent
German emigrants to England
German women rappers
German Internet celebrities
German people of Ivorian descent
Rappers from London
UK drill musicians